Carlos Alberto Gonçalves da Cruz (born 1944) is a Brazilian herpetologist. He works at the National Museum in Rio de Janeiro.

Taxa named in Cruz's honor
 Craugastor cruzi (McCranie, Savage & Wilson, 1989)
 Hyla cruzi (Pombal & Bastos, 1998)
 Chiasmocleis crucis (Caramaschi & Pimenta, 2003)

Taxa described

Chiasmocleis alagoanus
Chiasmocleis atlantica
Chiasmocleis capixaba
Chiasmocleis carvalhoi
Chiasmocleis jimi
Chiasmocleis mehelyi
Hyla arildae
Hyla buriti
Hyla callipygia
Hyla cavicola
Hyla ericae
Hyla fluminea
Hyla gouveai
Hyla ibirapitanga
Hyla leucopygia
Hyla phaeopleura
Hyla pseudomeridiana
Hyla sibilata
Hyla stenocephala
Hyla weygoldti
Hylomantis granulosa
Melanophryniscus simplex
Melanophryniscus spectabilis
Phasmahyla exilis
Phrynohyas lepida
Phrynomedusa bokermanni
Phrynomedusa marginata
Phrynomedusa vanzolinii
Phyllodytes brevirostris
Phyllodytes kautskyi
Plectrohyla chrysopleura
Proceratophrys phyllostomus
Proceratophrys subguttata
Pseudis tocantins
Scinax agilis

Citations

Living people
Place of birth missing (living people)
Brazilian herpetologists
1944 births